The 2015 IPSC Shotgun World Shoot II held at the shooting range "Le Tre Piume" near Agna, Italy was the 2nd IPSC Shotgun World Shoot. The match consisted of 30 stages over 5 days and 635 competitors from 30 nations.

Champions

Open 
The Open division was the second largest division with 189 competitors (29.8 %).

Individual

Teams

Modified 
The Modified division had 92 competitors (14.5 %).

Individual

Teams

Standard 
The Standard division was the largest division with 229 competitors (36.1 %).

Individual

Teams

Standard Manual 
The Manual division was the third largest division with 125 competitors (19.7 %).

Individual

Teams

See also 
IPSC Handgun World Shoots
IPSC Rifle World Shoots
IPSC Action Air World Shoots

References

 IPSC :: Match Results - 2015 Shotgun World Shoot, Italy
 2015 Shotgun World Championship - Full results

2015
2015 in shooting sports
Shooting competitions in Italy
2015 in Italian sport
International sports competitions hosted by Italy